William Charles Roberts (4 December 1908 – 16 May 1998) was an Australian rules footballer who played with St Kilda in the Victorian Football League (VFL).

Roberts played at Wesley College and was recruited to St Kilda from Oakleigh. His younger brother Arthur Roberts also played for St Kilda.

He was used on the wing until 1930, when he replaced Barney Carr as St Kilda's centreman.

Roberts represented Victoria on six occasions.

Roberts later served in the Australian Army during World War II.

References

1908 births
1998 deaths
Australian rules footballers from Victoria (Australia)
St Kilda Football Club players
People educated at Wesley College (Victoria)
People from Warragul
Australian Army personnel of World War II
Military personnel from Victoria (Australia)